Dreams in a Drawer is a 1957 Italian romantic drama film written and directed by Renato Castellani and starring Lea Massari.

Plot
Mario and Lucia, two young students from the University of Pavia, fall in love. Lucia's father decides that the girl interrupts her studies and returns to the country waiting for the wedding, to be celebrated after Mario's graduation. The two young men therefore decide to get married. Their happiness will be short-lived: Lucia will die in giving birth to a girl.

Cast 
 
 Lea Massari as Lucia Moretti
  Enrico Pagani as  Mario Bonelli
 Lilla Brignone as  Antonietta, Lucia's Mother
 Sergio Tofano as Lucia's Father 
 Carlo D'Angelo as The Substitute
 Cosetta Greco as Lina
  Armando Anzelmo as Monsignor 
 Guglielmo Inglese as  The Neurology Professor 
 Adriana Facchetti 	 as  The Landlady 
 Guido Celano as  The Hospital Doctor

References

External links

Italian romantic drama films
1957 romantic drama films
Films directed by Renato Castellani
1957 films
Italian black-and-white films
1950s Italian films